"Don't Let Go the Coat" is a song written by Pete Townshend and first released on The Who's 1981 album Face Dances.
 
It was released as a single following up on the first single from Face Dances, "You Better You Bet", but did not achieve the same success, reaching number 47 in the UK and number 84 in the US. 
It has also been released on several compilation albums, and Pete Townshend himself released an alternate version of the song on his album Another Scoop.

Music and lyrics
Several authors, including Stephen Thomas Erlewine, regard the lyrics of "Don't Let Go the Coat" as an ode to spiritual guru Meher Baba.  The title then refers to Meher Baba's charge that his disciples "hang fast to the hem of my robe," where the robe is a metaphor for his teachings.
Alternatively, the song could refer to Pete Townshend's parents, who were the ones who would pick him up when Pete Townshend descended into drugs and alcohol.
But regardless, the song strikes themes of spiritual torment, fear of abandonment and the need to keep faith, beginning with the lines:

"I can't be held responsible for blown behavior
I've lost all contact with my only saviour"

Musically, "Don't Let Go the Coat" has a country rock flavor.  Authors Steve Grantley and Alan Parker describe the guitar sound as being similar to that of The Pretenders, and note that the Pete Townshend's acoustic guitar solo has Spanish inflections.

Reception
Record World described the chorus as "nifty", Townsend's guitar solo as "tasteful" and Roger Daltrey's lead vocal as "gentle."

John Atkins acknowledges that the song is melodic, but claims that it is bland and notes that it has less energy than "You Better You Bet".  Grantley and Parker, while praising the "pristine production" by Bill Szymczyk, note that the song "never really gets out of first gear."  Chris Charlesworth asserts that lead singer Roger Daltrey's bravado is ill-suited to the song's confession of inadequacy and unworthiness.  Erlewine, however, claims that "Don't Let Go the Coat" is "one of [Townshend's] better odes to Meher Baba."

Other releases

"Don't Let Go the Coat" was included on The Ultimate Collection compilation album in some countries in 2002.  A promotional video of the song appeared on Who's Better, Who's Best: The Videos in 1988.  A live video performance from 1981 was included on the DVD set Thirty Years of Maximum R&B Live.  Townshend released a version of "Don't Let Go the Coat," with himself on lead vocal, on his 1987 album Another Scoop.  SPIN Magazine favorably contrasted this version with that of The Who, noting in particular Townshend's "newfound rock exuberance."

Charts

References

The Who songs
1981 singles
Songs written by Pete Townshend
Song recordings produced by Bill Szymczyk
Pete Townshend songs
Warner Records singles
Polydor Records singles
1980 songs
Country rock songs